Keith Chapman (3 March 1934 – 13 December 2007) was an Australian rules footballer who played with Essendon in the Victorian Football League (VFL). He later played for Coburg in the Victorian Football Association (VFA).

Notes

External links 		
		

Essendon Football Club past player profile
		
		
		

1934 births
2007 deaths
Australian rules footballers from Victoria (Australia)
Essendon Football Club players
Coburg Football Club players